Rostyslav Andriyovych Hertsyk (born 5 July 1989) is a Ukrainian foil fencer.

Career
He was silver medallist at the Copa Villa La Habana in 2011 and bronze medallist at the Löwe von Bonn in 2012, but narrowly missed the qualifications for the 2012 Summer Olympics in London. 42nd in FIE rankings before the 2013 World Fencing Championships, he created an upset by defeating successively Peter Joppich, Race Imboden, and Andrea Cassarà. He lost in the semi-finals by Russia's Artur Akhmatkhuzin and earned a bronze medal. Hertsyk took part in October in the 2013 World Combat Games, but was defeated in the first round by Imboden, who eventually took the silver medal.

Hertsyk is a student at the Lviv State University of Physical Culture. He is the grandson of Miroslav Hertsyk, rector of the University and a key instrument in the development of rowing in the Lviv region.

References

Links 

 Profile at the European Fencing Confederation

Ukrainian male foil fencers
Living people
1989 births
Universiade medalists in fencing
Universiade bronze medalists for Ukraine
Medalists at the 2017 Summer Universiade